Farouk Abdesselem (born 9, September 1991) is a French Karateka and a national coach of the Indonesian Karate team. Holder of -84 kilogram, Farouk has represented France in several championships of the World European championship, and European games. He won the bronze medal in the Premier League in Lisbon and qualified for the Olympic tournament (TQO) in Paris to represent the French team for Olympic Games in Tokyo 2020. In 2022, Farouk became the national coach of the Indonesian Karate team for the 2021 SEA Games which won five gold, six bronze, and three silver medals. Farouk is the 5th in the world in 84 kg Karateka, with multi-medalists at international tournaments.

Achievements

References 

Living people
French male karateka
21st-century French people
1991 births